Prechisty (masculine), Prechistaya (feminine), or Prechistoye (neuter) is the name of several inhabited localities in Russia.

Urban localities
Prechistoye, Pervomaysky District, Yaroslavl Oblast, a work settlement in Pervomaysky District of Yaroslavl Oblast

Rural localities
Prechistoye, Kaluga Oblast, a village in Yukhnovsky District of Kaluga Oblast
Prechistoye, Kostroma Oblast, a village in Sidorovskoye Settlement of Krasnoselsky District of Kostroma Oblast
Prechistoye, Moscow Oblast, a village in Novopetrovskoye Rural Settlement of Istrinsky District of Moscow Oblast
Prechistoye, Dukhovshchinsky District, Smolensk Oblast, a selo in Prechistenskoye Rural Settlement of Dukhovshchinsky District of Smolensk Oblast
Prechistoye, Gagarinsky District, Smolensk Oblast, a selo in Prechistenskoye Rural Settlement of Gagarinsky District of Smolensk Oblast
Prechistoye, Vologda Oblast, a village in Nikolsky Selsoviet of Kaduysky District of Vologda Oblast
Prechistoye, Lyubimsky District, Yaroslavl Oblast, a village in Osetsky Rural Okrug of Lyubimsky District of Yaroslavl Oblast
Prechistoye, Rostovsky District, Yaroslavl Oblast, a selo in Itlarsky Rural Okrug of Rostovsky District of Yaroslavl Oblast